Joshua Lafayette Smith was mayor of Dallas, Texas in 1861; he was shot to death in 1867.

References

1867 deaths
1867 murders in the United States
19th-century American politicians
Mayors of Dallas
People murdered in Texas
Male murder victims
Deaths by firearm in Texas
Date of birth missing